Dioctyl sebacate (also di(2-ethylhexyl) sebacate, commonly abbreviated as DOS, DEHS, and BEHS) is an organic compound which is the diester of sebacic acid and 2-ethylhexanol.
It is an oily colorless liquid and is used as a plasticizer, including in the explosive C4.  It has also found use in Dot 5 brake fluid, in ester based engine oils and additives, as seed particle for Particle Image Velocimetry (PIV)  and as a model compound that forms stable aerosols.

References

Carboxylate esters
Plasticizers